Alison Buchan is the Carolyn Fite Professor at the University of Tennessee. She is known for her work on bacteria in natural environments, especially bacteria within the Roseobacter group. In 2022 she was named a fellow of the American Academy of Microbiology.

Education and career 
Buchan received a B.Sc. from James Madison University in 1994. She then moved to the University of Georgia where she earned a M.Sc. (1997) and a Ph.D. (2001). She was a postdoctoral investigator at Yale University from 2003 until 2005 at which point she moved to the University of Tennessee. In 2016 she was promoted to professor, and as of 2022 she is the Carolyn Fite Professor.

Research 
Buchan's early research examined biochemical pathways used by Roseobacter, a common marine bacteria, and the chemical compounds used by Roseobacter as they grow on surfaces. Buchan's research revealed how viruses change the chemical compounds released by bacteria and how heterotrophic bacteria alter the organic carbon produced by marine phytoplankton. She has also examined the interactions between Roseobacter and the viruses that infect them.

Selected publications

Awards and honors 
In 2022 Buchan was elected a fellow of the American Academy of Microbiology, and received the 2022 faculty achievement award from the University of Tennessee.

References

External links 

 

Living people
Women microbiologists
Women chemists
Ecologists
University of Georgia alumni
James Madison University alumni
University of Tennessee faculty
Fellows of the American Academy of Microbiology
Year of birth missing (living people)